Mitchell Ferguson (born April 29, 2003), is an American soccer player who plays as a defender for Notre Dame Fighting Irish. via the Portland Timbers academy.

Club career
After playing with the Portland Timbers academy, Ferguson appeared for Portland's USL Championship side Portland Timbers 2 on October 15, 2019 as an 84th-minute substitute during a 4-1 loss to El Paso Locomotive.

In 2022, Ferguson attended the University of Notre Dame to play college soccer.

References

External links
 

2003 births
Living people
Association football defenders
American soccer players
MLS Next Pro players
Notre Dame Fighting Irish men's soccer players
Portland Timbers 2 players
Soccer players from Illinois
USL Championship players